The Miss Show-Me Basketball honor recognizes the top female high school basketball player in the state of Missouri. The name of the award differs from other Miss Basketball awards to reflect Missouri's state nickname, the Show-Me State. The award is presented annually by the Missouri Basketball Coaches Association. In order to be considered for the award, nominees must have been nominated by their high school coach, started in 90 percent of all games, must be high school seniors, and must be of "outstanding moral character". Ten girls are selected as finalists after nominations are compiled, and a special committee of assistant college coaches in Missouri choose the winner.

The first recipient of the honor was Janet Clark in 1985, who is the all-time leader in total points scored for the Northwest Missouri State Bearcats women's basketball team with 2,121 points. Two sisters, Lori and Lisa Sandbothe, received the honor in 1986 and 1987 respectively and both went on to play for the Missouri Tigers women's basketball team. In 2015, the honor was shared between Napheesa Collier and Sophie Cunningham, who both played as teammates in the McDonald's All-American Game that year. Five recipients of the Miss Show-Me Basketball honor have been drafted into the WNBA, the highest draft pick being Kristin Folkl with the 1st overall pick in the 1999 WNBA Draft as part of the initial expansion player allocation. Other recipients of the honor have played with professional teams in Europe and Asia, such as Kari Koch and Shakara Jones in Greece, Heather Ezell in Iceland, and Yvonne Anderson in Turkey. Many recipients have also pursued coaching opportunities in high schools and colleges.

Winners

Schools with multiple winners

See also
 Mr. Show-Me Basketball
 Mr. Basketball USA

References

Missouri
High school sports in Missouri
Awards established in 1985
1985 establishments in Missouri
Women's sports in Missouri
Lists of people from Missouri
Basketball players from Missouri
Lists of American sportswomen
Missouri sports-related lists